Enida is a genus of sea snails, marine gastropod mollusks in the family Trochidae, the top snails (not assigned to a subfamily).

Description
The shell has a depressed-conical shape. It is widely umbilicate. The convex whorls are concentrically granose-lirate. The sutures are canaliculate. The body whorl is carinated or angulated. The aperture is subquadrate. The outer lip is simple, or lirate within. The inner lip is reflexed. The umbilicus is large. The margin is crenulated.

Species
Species within the genus Enida include:
 Enida persica Melvill, J.C. & R. Standen, 1903
 Enida japonica A. Adams, 1860
 Enida taiwanensis Z.Z. Dong, 2002

References

External links

 
Trochidae
Gastropod genera